This is a list of public art in the Cambridgeshire county of England. This list applies only to works of public art on permanent display in an outdoor public space. For example, this does not include artworks in museums.

Babraham

Cambridge

Clarkson Road

Homerton Gardens

Lensfield Road

Madingley Road

Sidgwick Site

Fordham

Peterborough

Ramsey

St Ives

References 

Cambridgeshire
Culture in Cambridgeshire
Public art